Tugur may refer to:
Tugur (river), a river in Khabarovsk Krai, Russian Far East.
Tugur Bay, a Bay in Khabarovsk Krai, Russian Far East.
Tugur (Khabarovsk Krai), a village in Khabarovsk Krai, Russian Far East.
Tukur, a village in North Khorasan Province, Iran.